The Party of Democratic Socialism was a democratic socialist political party in the Czech Republic. It was a founding member party of the Party of the European Left.

The party has its name since December 1997. It's the political unification of SDL (Party of the Democratic Left) and LB (Left Block) that took place in June 1997. In the beginning the party had the name LB-SDL.

During 2017 Czech legislative election and many previous elections, members of the party ran on the Communist Party of Bohemia and Moravia's ballot.

In 2020, the party and The Real Left initiative merged into The Left.

References

External links
Official website

1997 establishments in the Czech Republic
2020 disestablishments in the Czech Republic
Defunct political parties in the Czech Republic
Defunct socialist parties in Europe
Democratic socialist parties in Europe
Party of the European Left former member parties
Political parties disestablished in 2020
Political parties established in 1997
Socialist parties in the Czech Republic